Chester Andrew Jastremski (January 12, 1941 – May 3, 2014) was an American competition swimmer, Olympic medalist and world record-holder.

Jastremski attended Indiana University in Bloomington, Indiana, where he swam for Doc Counsilman's Indiana Hoosiers swimming and diving team.  He and Counsilman invented the "whip kick" to replace the frog kick, previously used in the breaststroke. The whip kick minimized drag and accentuated Jastremski's very powerful shoulders and upper arms. Over the years, the original whip kick (done from the knee to feet) morphed into the breaststroke kick that uses the entire leg. He was featured on the January 29, 1962 cover of Sports Illustrated.

At the 1964 Summer Olympics in Tokyo, Jastremski represented the United States.  He won the bronze medal in the men's 200-meter breaststroke, finishing with a third-place time of 2:29.6.  He again qualified for the U.S. team for the 1968 Summer Olympics in Mexico City, and swam for the winning American team in the preliminary heats of the men's 4×100-meter medley relay.  He was inducted into the International Swimming Hall of Fame in 1977, and the National Polish American Sports Hall of Fame in 2007.

Jastremski received his medical degree from Indiana University in 1968, where he was also a member of Sigma Nu Fraternity.  He was a member of the 1976 U.S. Olympic medical team.  He served as a family practice physician for 35 years before rheumatoid arthritis led him to retire.  He practiced medicine in Bloomington, Indiana, and frequently visited the Indiana University swim team throughout the years.

In 2007, he was inducted into the National Polish-American Sports Hall of Fame. He died on May 3, 2014, aged 73, in Bloomington, after battling cancer, arthritis, and Parkinson's disease.

See also
 List of members of the International Swimming Hall of Fame
 List of Indiana University (Bloomington) people
 List of Olympic medalists in swimming (men)
 World record progression 100 metres breaststroke
 World record progression 200 metres breaststroke
 World record progression 4 × 100 metres medley relay

References

External links
 
 
 
  www.toledoblade.com
  Sports Illustrated
  indianaswimming.us 

1941 births
2014 deaths
American male breaststroke swimmers
American male medley swimmers
American people of Polish descent
Physicians from Indiana
Deaths from cancer in Indiana
Neurological disease deaths in Indiana
Deaths from arthritis
Deaths from Parkinson's disease
World record setters in swimming
Indiana Hoosiers men's swimmers
Indiana University School of Medicine alumni
Olympic bronze medalists for the United States in swimming
Pan American Games gold medalists for the United States
Sportspeople from Toledo, Ohio
Swimmers at the 1963 Pan American Games
Swimmers at the 1964 Summer Olympics
Swimmers at the 1968 Summer Olympics
Medalists at the 1964 Summer Olympics
Pan American Games medalists in swimming
Medalists at the 1963 Pan American Games
20th-century American people
21st-century American people